A. C. Bang was a furrier situated on Strøget in Copenhagen, Denmark. It was founded in 1816 and had status of Purveyor to the Court of Denmark from 1905. Its former building, located at the corner of Østergade (No. 27) and Bremerholm, is from 1932–34 and was designed by Bent Helweg-Møller.

History
 
The company was founded by Jørgen Daniel Bang (1790-1864) on 6 September 1816 when he opened a store in his father's building at the corner of Østerfade and Kongens Nytorv. He received a commission for bearskins for the Royal Life Guards and was appointed royal furrier in 1817. 

Bang's son, Anton Christian Bang (1823-1897), took over the company after his father's death in 1861. In 1888 he ceded it to his son Oscar Bang (1863-) who renamed it after his father. The company had many customers in the Danish royal family and was in 1905 once again appointed to royal furrier (from 1963: Purveyors to the Court of Denmark). In 1908 it opened a branch specializing in wholesale one the other side of Østergade. 

 
Oscar Bang's son Aage Bang (1891-1955) took over the company after his father's death in 1923. He commissioned a new headquarters for the company which was inaugurated at the corner of Østergade and the new street Bremerholm in 1934. In the 1950s A. C. Bang won an international reputation for its mink furs. It launched a collaboration with Balmain, creating furs that were specially adapted for Erik Mortensen's dresses. The ownership of the company passed out of the Bang family.

The 1980s were difficult times for the fur industry internationally and A. C. Bang's stores began to focus on jewelry, accessories and high-end fashion clothing. The market for fur improved somewhat in the 1990s. A. C. Bang opened a second store on Lyngby Hovedgade in Kongens Lyngby and its products were also sold in a high-end chain of department stores in Japan as well as in two shops in Tokyo and Zürich.

Building
 
The company's former headquarters at the corner of Østergade and Bremerholm is a seven-story Modernist building.  A tall pillar with a statue of Diana trying to catch a small fur animal runs along the full height of the building and a few meters higher on  its Strøget side.

References

External links

 Official website
 Photo albums

Furriers 
Shops in Copenhagen
Modernist architecture in Copenhagen
Danish companies established in 1816
Manufacturing companies established in 1816